Jagadhekamalla II (r.1138–1151 CE) followed Someshvara III to the Western Chalukya throne. His rule saw the slow decline of the Chalukya empire with the loss of Vengi entirely, though he was still able to control the Hoysalas in the south and the Seuna and Paramara in the north. He patronised Kannada grammarian Nagavarma II, who wrote many famous works including Kavyavalokana and Karnataka Bhashabhushana. Jagadhekamalla II himself was a merited scholar and wrote in Sanskrit Sangithachudamani a work on music.

References

 Dr. Suryanath U. Kamat (2001). Concise History of Karnataka, MCC, Bangalore (Reprinted 2002).

Sources
 
 
 
 
 

1151 deaths
Western Chalukya Empire
12th-century Indian monarchs
Hindu monarchs